The following is a list of spouses of holders of the position of president of the Philippines.

Customarily, the wife or husband of the president held the title of First Lady or First Gentleman serving functional role at the Malacañang Palace. Hence the titles are also erroneously used to refer to the president's spouse.

Three spouses, that of Elpidio Quirino, Diosdado Macapagal and Corazon Aquino, were already deceased at the start of their respective partner's presidencies although Macapagal was married to his second wife at the start of his presidency.

In the case of Rodrigo Duterte, his marriage with Elizabeth Zimmerman was already annulled at the start of his presidency. Duterte had another partner, Cielito Avanceña his common-law wife.

Benigno Aquino III is the only unmarried president.

List

Entries in dark grey denotes spouses who were not married during their partner's presidencies either due to their death, their marriage that had been nullified, or they would be married after their partner's presidency.
Benigno Aquino III has never been married.

Notes

 
Philippines